Filet crochet is a type of crocheted fabric. This type of crocheted lace is gridlike because it uses only two crochet stitches: the chain stitch and the double crochet stitch (U.S. terminology; known in some other countries as chain stitch and treble). Old filet patterns used a treble or triple stitch vertically but chained two between the vertical stitches.  This was to prevent distortion of some patterns. Chain stitches use less yarn than double crochet stitches, which results in a visual difference in appearance between the two kinds of stitch.  Filet crochet forms patterns by filling in parts of a mostly chain stitch mesh with double crochet stitches.  Filet crochet is usually constructed from monotone crochet thread made of Mercerised cotton in white or ecru, and worked in rows.  Filet crochet is used for decorative applications such as window curtains, tablecloths, and place settings such as coasters and placemats. 

Filet crochet is most often worked from a graph or a symbol diagram. Patterns are created by combining solid and open meshes, usually working the design in solid meshes and the background in open meshes.  The size of the space is determined by the number of chain stitches between each double stitch. Filet crochet may also be worked by alternating chain stitches with another type of crochet stitch such as (U.S. terminology) half double or triple crochet, and may be worked from yarn instead of thread.

See also
List of crochet stitches

Notes

References

 Edie Eckman, The Crochet Answer Book, North Adams, Massachusetts: Storey Publishing, 2005.
 Kara Heun, Crochet Stitches: How to Filet Crochet, Prime Publishing LLC, 2017. http://www.allfreecrochet.com/Tutorials/Crochet-Stitches-How-to-Filet-Crochet

Crocheted lace